George Peternousek (born March 11, 1947) is a former professional ice hockey player.

Born in Prague, Czechoslovakia, Peternousek later became a naturalized Dutch citizen and competed for the Netherlands national ice hockey team at both the 1980 Winter Olympics and the 1981 World Ice Hockey Championships.

A defenceman, Peternousek scored a goal and two assists in all 5 of Holland's games in Lake Placid. He had two assists in 8 games at the World Championships the following year.

Peternousek played for thirdteen years with Dutch club Tilburg Trappers.

References
 
Dutch Olympic Committee
 TYSC Trappers history website

1947 births
Living people
Czechoslovak emigrants to the Netherlands
Czechoslovak ice hockey players
Dutch ice hockey defencemen
Dutch people of Czech descent
Ice hockey players at the 1980 Winter Olympics
Olympic ice hockey players of the Netherlands
Ice hockey people from Prague
TYSC Trappers players